Xestia tecta is a moth of the family Noctuidae. In Europe the species is only known from the boreal area of Fennoscandia, north-western Russia and the northern Ural Mountains. Outside Europe it occurs in northern and central Siberia and the north-western USA including Alaska as well as north-western and central Canada.

The wingspan is 32–41 mm. Adults are on wing from June to August. The species takes two years to reach maturity.

The larvae feed on hardwood shrubs such as Huckleberries (Vaccinium spp.).

Subspecies
Xestia tecta tecta
Xestia tecta tectoides (Corti, 1926) (Labrador)

References
 Michael Fibiger: Noctuinae II. In: W. G. Tremewan (Editor.): Noctuidae Europaeae, Vol. 2, Entomological Press, Sorø 1993, page 155/156,

External links

Lepiforum 
Bug Guide
Distribution in USA
Pacific Northwest Moths
Fauna Europaea

Xestia
Moths of Europe
Moths of Asia
Moths of North America
Moths described in 1808